The High Steward in the universities of Oxford and Cambridge (sometimes erroneously known as the Lord High Steward) is a university official. Originally a deputy for the Chancellor, the office of High Steward had by the 18th century undergone the same evolution and become a position by which the universities honoured prominent external figures. The High Stewards still retain some functions relating to adjudication in disputes, appeals, and deputizing if there is a vacancy in the Chancellorship. In Oxford, the office of High Steward is now more similar to the office of Commissary in Cambridge.

In Cambridge, the High Steward is elected by the members of the University Senate voting in person, one of that body's few remaining functions, and holds office until he or she voluntarily resigns or until the Senate otherwise determines. The Deputy High Steward is appointed by the High Steward by letters patent. The High Steward and the Deputy High Steward perform "such duties as have heretofore been customary and any duties prescribed by Statute or Ordinance". When the office of High Steward is vacant the duties of that office are performed by the Deputy High Steward.

In Oxford, the High Steward is appointed by the Chancellor of the university.

High Stewards of the University of Cambridge

Lopham, Thomas 1418
Harcourt, Robert (1446–1471)
Bray, Reginald, Sir, before 1503
Sir Richard Empson 1504
Mordaunt, John, Sir 1504
Ormston, Roger, Sir 1504
Lovell, Thomas, Sir 1509
Winkfield/Wingfield, Richard, Sir 1524
More, Thomas, Sir 1525
Blount, William, Lord Mountjoy 1529
Cromwell, Thomas 1534 **
Howard, Thomas, Duke of Norfolk (1554) 1540
William Paget, 1st Baron Paget (1554–1563)
Dudley, Robert, Earl of Leicester 1563
Hatton, Christopher, Sir 1588
Cecil, Robert, Sir (Earl of Salisbury, 1605) 1591 **
Howard, Thomas (Earl of Suffolk, 1603) 1601 **
Coke, Edward, Sir 1614
Montagu, Henry, Earl of Manchester 1634
Craven, William, Earl of Craven 1667
Montagu Charles, Earl of Manchester 1697
Arthur Annesley, 5th Earl of Anglesey (1722–37)
Thomas Pelham-Holles, 1st Duke of Newcastle (1737–42)
Thomas Wriothesley, 1st Earl of Southampton (1742–49)
Philip Yorke, 1st Earl of Hardwicke (1749–64)
Philip Yorke, 2nd Earl of Hardwicke (1764–90)
William Pitt the Younger (1790–1806)
Philip Yorke, 3rd Earl of Hardwicke (1806–34)
Hugh Percy, 3rd Duke of Northumberland (1834–40) **
John Copley, 1st Baron Lyndhurst (1840–1863)
Edward Herbert, 3rd Earl of Powis (1863–91)
Thomas de Grey, 6th Baron Walsingham (1891–1919)
Robert Windsor-Clive, 1st Earl of Plymouth (1919–23)
Victor Cavendish, 9th Duke of Devonshire (1923–38)
Edward Cavendish, 10th Duke of Devonshire (1938–1950)
Viscount Ruffside (1951–58)
Rab Butler, Lord Butler of Saffron Walden (1958–66)
Lord Devlin (1966–91)
Lord Runcie ( –2001)
Dame Bridget Ogilvie (2001–2009)
Lord Watson of Richmond (2010– )
 Elected Chancellor of Cambridge University

High Stewards of the University of Oxford

John de la Pole, 2nd Duke of Suffolk 1472 (died 1492)
Sir William Stonor 1492 (died 1494)
Sir Reginald Bray 1494 (died 1503)
Sir Thomas Lovell (died 1524)
Sir Thomas More 1524 (died 1535)
John Russell, 1st Earl of Bedford 1542–1555 (died 1555)
Henry Fitzalan, 12th Earl of Arundel 1555–1559
John Lumley, 1st Baron Lumley 1559–1609 (died 1609)
Henry Howard, 1st Earl of Northampton 1609–1614 (died 1614)
Philip Herbert, 4th Earl of Pembroke 1615–1641
William Fiennes, 1st Viscount Saye and Sele 1641–1643, 1646–1650
George Digby, 2nd Earl of Bristol 1643–1646
John Egerton, 2nd Earl of Bridgewater 1663–1686 (died 1686)
Henry Hyde, 2nd Earl of Clarendon 1686–1709 (died 1709)
Laurence Hyde, 1st Earl of Rochester 1709–1711 (died 1711)
Henry Hyde, 4th Earl of Clarendon 1711–1753 (died 1753)
John Fane, 7th Earl of Westmorland 1754–1762 (died 1762)
Hamilton Boyle, 6th Earl of Cork 1762–1764 (1730–1764)
Edward Leigh, 5th Baron Leigh 1767–1786 (died 1786)
William Legge, 2nd Earl of Dartmouth July 1788–1801 (died 1801)
John Scott, 1st Earl of Eldon 1801–1838 (died 1838)
William Courtenay, 10th Earl of Devon 1838–1859 (died 1859)
Henry Herbert, 4th Earl of Carnarvon 1859 (died 1890)
John Sankey, 1st Viscount Sankey (died 1948)
John Simon, 1st Viscount Simon 1948–1954
Gavin Simonds, 1st Viscount Simonds 1954–1967
Richard Wilberforce, Baron Wilberforce 1967–1990
Robert Goff, Baron Goff of Chieveley 1991–2001
Tom Bingham, Baron Bingham of Cornhill 2001–2008
Alan Rodger, Baron Rodger of Earlsferry 2008–2011
Simon Brown, Baron Brown of Eaton-under-Heywood 2011–2012
Jonathan Mance, Baron Mance 2012–2018
Robert Reed, Baron Reed of Allermuir 2018-Present

References 

Lists of people associated with the University of Cambridge
Oxbridge
Terminology of the University of Cambridge
Terminology of the University of Oxford